Jaz-O & The Immobilarie Family Present: Kingz Kounty is the only collaborative studio album by American rapper and producer Jaz-O and hip hop group the Immobilarie. It was released on March 26, 2002 via D&D Records and Rancore Records. It featured guest appearances from Big Angie, DK, Grandmaster Caz, Jay-Z, M.O.P., Mr. Cheeks, Shareefah, and the HoodFellaz. The album debuted at number 100 on the Top R&B/Hip-Hop Albums chart and spawned two singles: "Let's Go" and "Love Is Gone", the latter peaking at number 20 on the Hot Rap Songs chart.

Track listing

References

External links 

2002 albums
Jaz-O albums
Albums produced by DJ Premier
Albums produced by Jaz-O